The 2015 Super League season, known as the First Utility Super League XX for sponsorship reasons, was the 20th rugby league season since the Super League was introduced in 1996. Twelve teams competed over 23 rounds, including the Magic Weekend, after which the eight highest entered the play-offs for a place in the Grand Final. The four lowest teams entered the Super League Qualifying Play-off, along with the four highest Championship teams, to decide which will play in Super League XXI. The regular season started in February 2015 and culminated with the grand final on 10 October.

Leeds Rhinos became only the 3rd team to complete the treble after defeating Wigan Warriors 22-20 in front of a new record attendance of 73,512 at Old Trafford to win their 7th Super League title.

Teams
Super League XX is the first year since 2008 in which there is a promotion and relegation with the Championship. Super League has been reduced to 12 teams as part of the re-structuring of Super League and the Championship.

Eleven teams in Super League are from the North of England: five teams, Warrington, St. Helens, Salford, Wigan and Widnes, west of the Pennines in the historic county of Lancashire and six teams, Huddersfield, Wakefield Trinity, Leeds, Castleford, Hull F.C. and Hull Kingston Rovers, to the east in Yorkshire. Catalans Dragons, in Perpignan, France, are the only team outside the North of England. With Bradford Bulls and London Broncos being relegated last season, this leaves St Helens, Wigan Warriors, Warrington Wolves and Leeds Rhinos as the only teams to have played in every season of Super League since 1996.

Standings

Regular season

The 2015 Super League season sees teams play each other home and away, and one team for a third time at the Magic Weekend. After 23 games, the league table is frozen and the teams are split up into "Super 8's". Teams finishing in the top 8 will play 7 more games each as they compete in the Super League Super 8 group for a place in the Grand Final. Teams finishing in the bottom four will join the top 4 teams from the Championship in The Qualifiers Super 8 group and also play 7 more games each for a place in the 2016 Super League competition.

Super 8s

Super League
The Super League Super 8's sees the top 8 teams from the Super League play 7 games each. Each team's points are carried over and after 7 additional games the top 4 teams will contest the play off semi-finals with the team in 1st hosting the team in 4th, and the team finishing 2nd hosting the 3rd placed team; the winners of these semi-finals will contest the Super League Grand Final at Old Trafford. 
Teams finishing 5th, 6th, 7th and 8th after the 7 additional games will take no further part in the 2015 season but will play in Super League again in 2016.

The Qualifiers

The Qualifiers Super 8's sees the bottom 4 teams from Super League table join the top 4 teams from the Championship. The points totals are reset to 0 and each team plays 7 games each, playing every other team once. After 7 games each the teams finishing 1st, 2nd, and 3rd will gain qualification to the 2016 Super League season. The teams finishing 4th and 5th will play in the "Million Pound Game" at the home of the 4th place team which will earn the winner a place in the 2016 Super League; the loser, along with teams finishing 6th, 7th and 8th, will be relegated to the Championship.

Player statistics

Top Try Scorers

Top goalscorers

Top try assists

Top points scorers

End-of-season awards
Awards are presented for outstanding contributions and efforts to players and clubs in the week leading up to the Super League Grand Final:

 Man of Steel: Zak Hardaker  
 Coach of the year: Brian McDermott  
 Super League club of the year:  Leeds Rhinos
 Young player of the year: George Williams  
 Foundation of the year:  Warrington Wolves
 Rhino "Top Gun": Kevin Sinfield  
 Metre-maker: Alex Walmsley  (4092)
 Top Try Scorer: Jermaine McGillvary  (27)
 Outstanding Achievement Award: 
 Hit Man: Danny Houghton

Media

Television
2015 is the fourth year of a five-year contract with Sky Sports to televise 70 matches per season. The deal which runs until 2016 is worth £90million.

Sky Sports coverage in the UK will see two live matches broadcast each week, usually at 8:00 pm on Thursday and Friday nights.

Regular commentators will be  Eddie Hemmings and Mike Stephenson with summarisers including Phil Clarke, Brian Carney, Barrie McDermott and Terry O'Connor. Sky will broadcast highlights on Sunday nights on Super League - Full Time at 10 p.m.

BBC Sport will broadcast a highlights programme called the Super League Show, presented by Tanya Arnold. The BBC show two weekly broadcasts of the programme, the first to the BBC North West, Yorkshire, North East and Cumbria, and East Yorkshire and Lincolnshire regions on Monday evenings at 11:35 p.m. on BBC One, while a repeat showing is shown nationally on BBC Two on Tuesday afternoons at 1.30 p.m. The Super League Show is also available for one week after broadcast for streaming or download via the BBC iPlayer in the UK only. End of season play-offs are shown on BBC Two across the whole country in a weekly highlights package on Sunday afternoons.

Internationally, Super League is shown live or delayed on Showtime Sports (Middle East), Sky Sport (New Zealand), TV 2 Sport (Norway), Fox Soccer Plus (United States), Fox Sports (Australia) and Sportsnet World (Canada).

Radio

BBC Coverage:

 BBC Radio 5 Live Sports Extra (National DAB Digital Radio) will carry two Super League commentaries each week on Thursday and Friday nights (both kick off 8pm); this will be through the 5 Live Rugby league programme which is presented by Dave Woods with a guest summariser (usually a Super League player or coach) and also includes interviews and debate..
 BBC Radio Humberside will have full match commentary of all Hull KR and Hull matches.
 BBC Radio Leeds carry commentaries featuring Leeds, Castleford, Wakefield and Huddersfield.
 BBC Radio Manchester will carry commentary of Wigan and Salford whilst sharing commentary of Warrington with BBC Radio Merseyside.
 BBC Radio Merseyside (will have commentary on St Helens and Widnes matches whilst sharing commentary of Warrington with BBC Radio Manchester.

Commercial Radio Coverage:

 102.4 Wish FM will carry commentaries of Wigan & St Helens matches.
 107.2 Wire FM will carry commentaries on Warrington and Widnes matches.
 Radio Yorkshire will launch in March carrying Super League commentaries. 
 Radio Warrington (Online Station) all Warrington home games and some away games.
 Grand Sud FM covers every Catalans Dragons Home Match (in French).
 Radio France Bleu Roussillon covers every Catalans Dragons Away Match (in French).

All Super League commentaries on any station are available via the particular stations on-line streaming.

References

External links
Official Site
BBC Rugby League